Albert Jenkinson (first ¼ 1884 – death unknown) was an English professional rugby league footballer who played in the 1910s.

Background
Albert Jenkinson's birth was registered in Hunslet district, West Riding of Yorkshire, England.

International honours
Albert Jenkinson lost caps for England while at Hunslet in 1919 against Australia, in 1912 against Wales, in 1913 against Wales, and won caps for Great Britain while at Hunslet in 1911-12 against Australia (2 matches).

References

1884 births
England national rugby league team players
English rugby league players
Great Britain national rugby league team players
Hunslet F.C. (1883) players
People from Hunslet
Place of death missing
Rugby league wingers
Rugby league players from Leeds
Year of death missing